The Charles W. Noyes House is an historic single-family bungalow located at 271 Chestnut Street in the village of West Newton in Newton, Massachusetts. Designed in the American Craftsman style of architecture by Boston-based architect Hubert G. Ripley of Ripley & Le Boutillier, it was built in 1914.  It is  stories in height, with a broad shallow-pitched clipped-gable roof and stuccoed exterior.  The street-facing facade has banks of small-paned windows at each level.  The owner Charles W. Noyes was a lawyer.

On February 16, 1990, it was added to the National Register of Historic Places.

See also
 National Register of Historic Places listings in Newton, Massachusetts

References

Houses on the National Register of Historic Places in Newton, Massachusetts
Houses completed in 1914